Margaret "Peggy" Waller (born 1954) is an American scholar of 19th-century French literature. She is the Mary Ann Vanderzyl Reynolds Professor of Humanities and Professor of Romance Languages and Literatures at Pomona College in Claremont, California.

Early life and education 
Waller graduated summa cum laude from Lawrence University in 1976 with a degree in French. She then earned a doctorate in French from Columbia University, finishing in 1986.

Career 
Waller's works include a translation of Revolution in Poetic Language, a book by Julia Kristeva, and The Male Malady: Fictions of Impotence in the French Romantic Novel, published in 1993.

References

External links
Faculty page at Pomona College

1954 births
Living people
Pomona College faculty
19th-century French literature
American literary historians
Historians of French literature
American women historians
21st-century American women